
Gmina Raciechowice is a rural gmina (administrative district) in Myślenice County, Lesser Poland Voivodeship, in southern Poland.

Villages
Gmina Raciechowice contains the villages and settlements of Bojańczyce, Czasław, Dąbie, Gruszów, Kawec, Komorniki, Krzesławice, Krzyworzeka, Kwapinka, Mierzeń, Poznachowice Górne, Raciechowice, Sawa, Zegartowice and Żerosławice.

Neighbouring gminas
Gmina Raciechowice is bordered by the gminas of Dobczyce, Gdów, Jodłownik, Łapanów and Wiśniowa.

References
Polish official population figures 2006

Raciechowice
Myślenice County